

377001–377100 

|-bgcolor=#f2f2f2
| colspan=4 align=center | 
|}

377101–377200 

|-id=144
| 377144 Okietex ||  || The Oklahoma City Astronomy Club, founded in 1958, has run the Okie-tex star party annually since 1984. It offers amateur astronomers a relaxed observing atmosphere under some of the darkest skies in the central United States. || 
|}

377201–377300 

|-bgcolor=#f2f2f2
| colspan=4 align=center | 
|}

377301–377400 

|-bgcolor=#f2f2f2
| colspan=4 align=center | 
|}

377401–377500 

|-bgcolor=#f2f2f2
| colspan=4 align=center | 
|}

377501–377600 

|-bgcolor=#f2f2f2
| colspan=4 align=center | 
|}

377601–377700 

|-bgcolor=#f2f2f2
| colspan=4 align=center | 
|}

377701–377800 

|-bgcolor=#f2f2f2
| colspan=4 align=center | 
|}

377801–377900 

|-bgcolor=#f2f2f2
| colspan=4 align=center | 
|}

377901–378000 

|-bgcolor=#f2f2f2
| colspan=4 align=center | 
|}

References 

377001-378000